#5 Magazine is an online magazine founded and edited by Rio Ferdinand.

History

Ferdinand considered naming #5 Rio, but felt it not a tangible option over time. The first issue was published in April 2009. #5 has featured celebrities such as Juan Mata, Snoop Dogg, Riyad Mahrez and Ice Cube.

Frequency

As of 2009, #5 came out every two months, starting in April.

Demographic

#5 Magazine reports on its website that 78.03% of its readers are male, and that the most common age range of its readers is 25–34.

References

2009 establishments in the United Kingdom
Bi-monthly magazines published in the United Kingdom
Magazines established in 2009
Men's magazines published in the United Kingdom